Griffin-Christopher House is a historic home located Pickens, Pickens County, South Carolina.  It was built in 1887, and is a two-story, frame "L"-plan, I-house with a two-story rear addition.  It features a two-tiered full-height front and side porches with Folk Victorian decorative elements including jig-saw cut wood trim.

It was listed on the National Register of Historic Places in 2001.

References 

Houses on the National Register of Historic Places in South Carolina
Victorian architecture in South Carolina
Houses completed in 1887
Houses in Pickens County, South Carolina
National Register of Historic Places in Pickens County, South Carolina
Pickens, South Carolina